Charlotte Stagg is a British neurophysiologist who is a professor at the University of Oxford. She leads the Physiological Neuroimaging Group.

Early life and education 
Stagg studied physiology and medicine at the University of Bristol, graduating with pre-clinical and clinical honours and the Physiological Society prize. For her doctoral degree, she moved to the University of Oxford and worked at the Oxford Centre for Functional Magnetic Resonance Imaging (MRI) of the Brain (FMRIB) under the supervision of Paul Matthews and Heidi Johansen-Berg. During her DPhil, she looked to understand how people acquire new motor skills. She joined the Neuroplasticity group for her first postdoctoral position. In 2010 she moved to the Sobell Department of Motor Neuroscience and Movement Disorders, where she worked with John Rothwell for half a year, before joining Andrew Maudsley at the University of Miami. There she became interested in in vivo magnetic resonance spectroscopy.

Research and career 
After returning from Miami, Stagg started a GlaxoSmithKline Junior Research Fellowship at St Edmund Hall, Oxford. She returned to the FMRIB, where she worked with Heidi Johansen-Berg. In 2014 Stagg was awarded a Sir Henry Dale Fellowship by the Wellcome Trust and the Royal Society. Her research is focused on the neurophysiological processes associated with learning motor skills. Her early work looked to understand why particular people struggled with dance and piano lessons. In a clinical study Stagg taught volunteers a sequence of finger motions and monitored the levels of γ-aminobutyric acid (GABA), the brain's main inhibitory neurotransmitter. She showed that in people who quickly learned the finger motions, the levels of GABA fell quickly, which allowed neurons to create new circuitry.

Stagg demonstrated that ipsilesional anodal transcranial direct-current stimulation (tDCS) can support patients in recovery after stroke. In this form of tDCS, a positive current is applied to the damaged area of the brain. They used MRI scans to better understand brain activity before and after the tDCS, and showed that the stimulated regions were more active in the regions relevant to motor skills. Stagg has worked on magnetic resonance spectroscopy as a means to understand neuronal activity in vivo, through the measurement of glutamate and GABA.

Stagg was promoted to Professor of Human Neurophysiology in 2018.

Awards and honours 
 2015 elected to AcademiaNet
 2017 British Neuroscience Association Sieratzki UK-Israel Early Career Prize

Selected publications

References 

Neurophysiologists
Living people
Date of birth missing (living people)
Place of birth missing (living people)
Alumni of the University of Bristol
Alumni of the University of Oxford
Year of birth missing (living people)